Sammichele is a railway station in Sammichele di Bari, Italy. The station is located on the Bari-Casamassima-Putignano railway. The train services and the railway infrastructure are operated by Ferrovie del Sud Est.

Train services
The station is served by the following service(s):

Local services (Treno regionale) Bari - Casamassima - Putignano

References

This article is based upon a translation of the Italian language version as at May 2014.

Railway stations in Apulia
Buildings and structures in the Province of Bari